Jephtas Gelübde (The vow of Jephthah) was the first opera composed by Giacomo Meyerbeer. The first performance was at the Hoftheater (Cuvilliés Theatre) in Munich on 23 December 1812. Two manuscripts of the score survive, one in the British Library, London, the other in Brussels.

Composition history
Meyerbeer wrote Jephtas Gelübde while he was studying with Abt Vogler (and while he was still known as Jakob, rather than the first name Giacomo which he was to adopt after his studies in Italy). He completed the score in Würzburg in April 1812, writing the overture last of all. During his revision of the score in June and July, Meyerbeer had already begun writing his second opera, Wirth und Gast. The score reflects Vogler's interest in colourful orchestration.

Rehearsals began for the opera in November 1812, with which Meyerbeer was not satisfied. "Deliberate and accidental hindrances of every sort intruded, and even on 20 December I was not certain whether the opera would be given in the 23rd. Anxiety, annoyance and vexation of every sort bothered me in these six weeks." In the event there were three performances, and the opera was fairly successful with many numbers applauded, although the composer thought that Lanius, as Jephta, "played very mediocrely".

Roles

Recordings
Jephtas Gelübde - Sönke Tams Freier, Andrea Chudak, Ziazan, Marcus Elsäßer, Laurence Kalaidjian, Sofia Philharmonic Orchestra, Dario Salvi. 2 CDs   Marco Polo 2023

References
Notes

Sources
Meyerbeer, G., (trans. and ed. Robert Letellier), Diaries, Volume 1, Associated University Presses, 1999.

Further reading
Heidlberger, F., Jepthas Gelübde, in 'Meyerbeer und das europäische Musiktheater', ed. Döhring and Jacobshagen, Laaber, 1998 
Zimmermann, R., Meyerbeer, Berlin 1998 

Operas
Operas set in the Levant
Operas by Giacomo Meyerbeer
German-language operas
1812 operas
Operas based on the Bible